Herbert Henry Gatenby Moody was a Canadian architect.
He was born on 12 March 1903 to A. W. Moody and Elizabeth Jane Holland. He was educated at the Royal Military College of Canada in Kingston, Ontario. He graduated from the University of Manitoba with a degree in architecture in 1926.

He practiced architecture with Derby and Robinson Boston and Sproatt and Rolf Toronto, Ontario.

He and Robert E. Moore went into partnership from 1936–1976, in the architectural firm of Moody and Moore in Winnipeg, Manitoba.

He joined the  Manitoba Association of Architects in 1934 served as President of the Manitoba Association of Architects three times. He was a Fellow of the Royal Architectural Institute of Canada. He served as Chancellor of the College of Fellows.

He served with the Royal Canadian Engineers, Army Third Division, in England and northwest Europe, from 1941 to 1945.

Family
He and his first wife Alice Louise Taylor (1904–1938) had two children. He and his second wife, Lorraine Code (1908–1986) had one child.

Professional life 
Among the many projects Moody has completed in his career are the following:
Princess Elizabeth Hospital, 1950
Winnipeg Winter Club (200 River Avenue), c1950
St. John's College and Chapel, University of Manitoba (92 Dysart Road), 1958
Donnelly United Church (1226 Waller Avenue), 1964
University College, University of Manitoba (210 Dysart Road), 1964
Centennial Hall, University of Winnipeg (515 Portage Avenue), 1969–1972
Lockhart Hall, University of Winnipeg (Ellice Avenue), 1972
Royal Canadian Mounted Police D Division (Manitoba) Headquarters (1091 Portage Avenue), 1978
Fort Whyte Interpretive Centre, 1983 Fort Whyte Nature Centre
Winnipeg Arena

References

External links
Herbert Henry Gatenby Moody

1903 births
People from Winnipeg
Royal Military College of Canada alumni
1991 deaths
20th-century Canadian architects